Radmilo Mihajlović (born 19 November 1964) is a Bosnian retired footballer and Yugoslavia national football team player.

Club career

Early career
He started playing football at FK Sutjeska Foča and was spotted there as a talented forward.

Željezničar
In the 1983–84 season, he left for FK Željezničar Sarajevo. He played more than 100 league games and scored more than 50 league goals before he left the club in 1988. He was the top goalscorer in the Yugoslav First League 1986–87 Yugoslav First League season with 23 goals.

With Željezničar, he reached the semi-finals of the 1984–85 UEFA Cup. He left the club in 1988.

Dinamo Zagreb
After leaving Željezničar, Mihajlović tried to engineer a move to Red Star Belgrade, the team that he and his family supported since childhood, though he ended up at Dinamo Zagreb where he arrived on initiative by head coach Ćiro Blažević.

He played for one season with the Zagreb club and was promoted to club captain by next head coach Josip Skoblar, becoming the first Serb, although a Bosnian Serb, to become captain of Dinamo Zagreb.

Bayern Munich
In 1989, he moved to West Germany to play for FC Bayern Munich. He scored four goals in 34 league matches for the club.

While at Bayern, he won the 1989–90 Bundesliga and the 1990 DFL-Supercup.

Schalke 04
During the 1990–91 winter transfer window, he moved to FC Schalke 04 of the 2. Bundesliga where he collected 58 league appearances and scored twelve goals.

With Schalke, he won the 2. Bundesliga in the 1990–91 season.

Later career and retirement
In his later career, Mihajlović played for Eintracht Frankfurt  before taking a three year break from active football.

After getting back to playing in 1997, he played for South Korean club Pohang Steelers with whom he won the 1996–97 AFC Champions League and also played for Cypriot side AEP Paphos FC where he definitely finished his career in 1998 at the age of 34.

International career
Mihajlović made his debut for Yugoslavia in an October 1986 European Championship qualification match against Turkey and has earned a total of 6 caps, scoring 1 goal. His final international was a December 1989 friendly match away against England.

International statistics

Post-playing career
After retiring from playing, Mihajlović worked as a player agent. He then spent some time as FK Rad's sporting director.

Personal life
Mihajlović's son, Stefan Mihajlović, is also a professional footballer.

Honours

Player
Bayern Munich
 Bundesliga: 1989–90
DFL-Supercup: 1990

Schalke 04
 2. Bundesliga: 1990–91

Pohang Steelers
AFC Champions League: 1996–97

Individual
Performance
Yugoslav First League Top Goalscorer: 1986–87 (23 goals)

References

External links
 
 
 

1964 births
Living people
People from Foča
Serbs of Bosnia and Herzegovina
Association football forwards
Yugoslav footballers
Yugoslavia international footballers
Bosnia and Herzegovina footballers
FK Željezničar Sarajevo players
GNK Dinamo Zagreb players
FC Bayern Munich footballers
FC Schalke 04 players
Eintracht Frankfurt players
Pohang Steelers players
AEP Paphos FC players
Yugoslav First League players
Bundesliga players
2. Bundesliga players
K League 1 players
Cypriot First Division players
Yugoslav expatriate footballers
Expatriate footballers in Germany
Yugoslav expatriate sportspeople in Germany
Bosnia and Herzegovina expatriate footballers
Bosnia and Herzegovina expatriate sportspeople in Germany
Expatriate footballers in South Korea
Bosnia and Herzegovina expatriate sportspeople in South Korea
Expatriate footballers in Cyprus
Bosnia and Herzegovina expatriate sportspeople in Cyprus
Association football agents